Wassa Amenfi West Municipal District is one of the fourteen districts in Western Region, Ghana. Originally it was formerly part of the then-larger Wassa Amenfi District in 1988, which was created from the former Aowin-Amenfi District Council, until eastern part of the district was split off to create Wassa Amenfi East District in August 2004; thus the remaining part has been renamed as Wassa Amenfi West District. Later, another part of the district was split off to create Wassa Amenfi Central District on 28 June 2012; thus the remaining part has been retained as Wassa Amenfi West District. However, on 15 March 2018, it was later elevated to municipal district assembly status to become Wassa Amenfi West Municipal District. The municipality is located in the northern part of Western Region and has Asankragua as its capital town.

Sources
 
 GhanaDistricts.com

References

Districts of the Western Region (Ghana)